Closet Children (original title: Les Enfants du Placard) is a 1977 French drama film directed by Benoît Jacquot.

Cast
 Brigitte Fossey as Juliette
 Lou Castel as Nicola
 Jean Sorel as Berlu
 Georges Marchal as the Father
 Danièle Gégauff as the Mother
 Christian Rist as Julien
 Isabelle Weingarten as Laure
 Hassane Fall as Diop
 Sophie Baragnon as Young Juliette
 Vincent Balvet as Young Nicola 
 Martine Simonet as the Prostitute

Accolades

References

External links
 

French drama films
1977 drama films
1977 films
Films directed by Benoît Jacquot
1970s French-language films
1970s French films